Chin Lee is a former Canadian city councillor in Toronto, Ontario, Canada from Scarborough for Ward 41 Scarborough-Rouge River until his resignation in May 2018.

Lee was elected to Toronto City Council in the November 2006 civic elections for Ward 41 - Scarborough—Rouge River. He replaced former councillor and  MPP Bas Balkissoon. Lee is also a member of the Scarborough Community Council.

Lee is one of Toronto City Council's three appointees to the seven-member Toronto Police Services Board where he presently serves as vice-chair.

He is one of four councillors of Asian heritage elected to city council in Toronto in 2014, the other three being Councillor Denzil Minnan-Wong, Councillor Kristyn Wong-Tam and Korean born, Councillor Raymond Cho.

Born to Chinese-Malaysian parents, his grandparents came from the Kaiping/Taishan region of the Guangdong province in China.

Community activism
Prior to entering politics Chin Lee served as President of the Goldhawk Community Association, serving the northeast Scarborough Community. 

He was a founding member of Scarborough Needs Accountable Politicians (SNAP), a community organization that was created to oppose pay increases that Scarborough School Board Trustees approved for themselves. 

Chin Lee, along with other community leaders such as Bas Balkissoon formed Scarborough Homeowners Alliance for Fair Taxation (SHAFT), a grassroots taxpayer group that fought to make changes to the Province of Ontario's property assessment system. 

On October 27, 2017, Lee announced that he will be seeking the Liberal nomination for the 2018 provincial election in Scarborough North. On November 6, 2017, he was acclaimed as the candidate. In the general election, he placed third, losing to incumbent Progressive Conservative MPP Raymond Cho by more than a two-to-one margin and placing behind the New Democratic candidate.

Election results

Lee also ran in the 1994 municipal elections in then Scarborough Ward 11:

Shaw, Sherene 	3,197
Lombardi, Don 	2,272
Lee, Chin 	1,944

References

External links

Living people
Canadian people of Malaysian descent
Toronto city councillors
Canadian politicians of Chinese descent
Year of birth missing (living people)